The Anglican Diocese of Christ Our Hope is a diocese of the Anglican Church in North America. The diocese originated from the dissolution of the Missionary District of PEARUSA, which resulted in the creation of two new dioceses, both admitted at the ACNA at their General Council on 21 June 2016. It has 34 parishes in 11 American states, which are Connecticut, Maine, Maryland, Massachusetts, New Jersey, New York, North Carolina, Ohio, Pennsylvania, Virginia, and West Virginia, and in Washington, D.C. The state with most parishes is North Carolina, with 11. The diocese's bishop ordinary is Steve Breedlove, since 2016, with Quigg Lawrence as the suffragan bishop and Alan J. Hawkins as the bishop coadjutor.

History
PEARUSA was created in 2012 as the missionary organization of the Province of the Anglican Church of Rwanda in the United States and Canada, a dual jurisdiction of his African mother church and the Anglican Church in North America. PEARUSA was divided in three regional networks, Mid-Atlantic and Northeast, Southwest and West. The Synod of the Province of the Anglican Church of Rwanda decided to fully transfer the jurisdiction of PEARUSA to the ACNA on 23 September 2015. This took place at ACNA's Provincial Council, held on 21 June 2016, with two dioceses being created, the Anglican Diocese of Christ Our Hope, who took over the Mid-Atlantic and Northeast Network, and the Anglican Diocese of the Rocky Mountains, who substituted the Southwest Network.

The diocese is dispersed across a large part of the Mid-Atlantic and Northeast regions of the United States, and one of its main purposes is church planting.

References

External links
Official Website

Dioceses of the Anglican Church in North America
Anglican dioceses established in the 21st century
Anglican realignment dioceses